The Mersey Tunnels connect the city of Liverpool with Wirral, under the River Mersey. There are three tunnels: the Mersey Railway Tunnel (opened 1886), and two road tunnels, the Queensway Tunnel (opened 1934) and the Kingsway Tunnel (opened 1971).  The railway tunnel and Queensway Tunnel connect central Liverpool with Birkenhead, while the Kingsway Tunnel runs to Wallasey.

The road tunnels are owned and operated by Merseytravel, and have their own police force, the Mersey Tunnels Police. In 1967 it was announced that the "Mersey Tunnel Scheme" was now operational. The scheme comprised what was claimed to be the largest closed circuit television system for traffic control outside North America, and featured a bank of 22 CRT monitors.

The Queensway Tunnel was used to film scenes for the film Harry Potter and the Deathly Hallows – Part 1 (2010).  This provided Claire House children's hospice in Wirral with a £20,000 windfall, the money being paid to Merseytravel by Warner Brothers, the makers of the film, for use of the Tunnel as a location.

In November 2012 scenes for the film Fast & Furious 6 (2013) were filmed in the Queensway Tunnel.

See also
 Architecture of Liverpool
 Monument to the Mersey Tunnel

References

External links
 Official website of the Mersey Tunnels
 Mersey Tunnels Users Association

River Mersey
Tunnels in Merseyside
Tunnels in Liverpool